Shi Wancheng (born on 13 August 1990 in Harbin) is a Chinese snowboarder.

2010 Winter Olympics
He competed at the 2010 Winter Olympics in the Halfpipe.

References

External links
 
 

1990 births
Living people
Chinese male snowboarders
Olympic snowboarders of China
Snowboarders at the 2010 Winter Olympics
Snowboarders at the 2014 Winter Olympics
Snowboarders at the 2018 Winter Olympics
Asian Games medalists in snowboarding
Snowboarders at the 2007 Asian Winter Games
Sportspeople from Harbin
Asian Games silver medalists for China
Medalists at the 2007 Asian Winter Games